CD-207 was a C Type class escort ship (Kaibōkan) of the Imperial Japanese Navy during the Second World War.

History
She was laid down by the Naniwa Dock Company at Osaka on 17 May 1944, launched on 22 August 1944, completed on 15 October 1944, and commissioned on 25 November 1944.

During the war CD-207 was mostly busy on escort duties.

After the surrender of Japan on 15 August 1945, CD-207 was demilitarized (stripped of all her offensive weapons) and under Allied direction served as a transport ship repatriating Japanese troops and civilians from 1 December 1945 until the end of 1946. On 4 July 1947 she was ceded to the US as a war reparation and sunk as a target on 13 August 1947 at 35-20N, 122-41E.

References

1944 ships
Ships built in Japan
Type C escort ships